Syrus is a character in Greek mythology after whom Syria and the Syrians are named.

Syrus may also refer to:
 Publilius Syrus, Syrian-born Latin writer best known for his sententiae
 Syrus of Pavia , bishop and saint
 Ephrem the Syrian ( – 373), Syriac Christian deacon and Syriac-language hymnographer and theologian
 Syrus of Genoa (died 381), bishop and saint
 Syrus Truesdale, a character in the Yu-Gi-Oh! GX anime series

See also
 Cyrus (disambiguation)
 Pieve of Saint Syrus (Cemmo), a church in Lombardy, Italy
 Siro (disambiguation)